Mayors of Tuskegee, Alabama include:

J. R. Wood
Joseph Oswalt Thompson
William Varner 1916 to 1919
Robert Fulwood Ligon
Philip M. Lightfoot defendant in a gerrymandering case after the state legislature redrew city boundaries to exclude African Americans. Case was brought by Charles Goode Gomillion as plaintiff and was decided by the U.S. Supreme Court against the gerrymandering. The case established a basis for the Voting Rights Act.
Johnny Ford, first African American mayor
Lucenia Williams Dunn, an African American, was elected in 2000 and was the first woman to serve as mayor of Tuskegee
Lawrence F. Haygood Jr (2016–present)

References

Tuskegee, Alabama
Tuskeegee